Ralph Donnell Coleman (born August 31, 1950) is a former professional American football linebacker in the National Football League for the Dallas Cowboys. He played college football at North Carolina A&T University.

Early years
Coleman attended Carver High School, where he was a part of the last graduating class, before the school merged with Spartanburg High School. He was a three-sport athlete (football, basketball and track). In 1967, as a two-way player (linebacker and offensive tackle), he helped his football team win a state championship.

He accepted a football scholarship from North Carolina A&T University to play defensive tackle. He was converted to linebacker and became a four-year starter. In 1968, he was a part of a team that finished the season 8–1 overall (6–1 in conference play) and won the black college football national championship.

Professional career

Dallas Cowboys
Coleman was selected by the Dallas Cowboys in the eighth round (208th overall) of the 1972 NFL draft. The Cowboys saw great potential and he became the first African-American linebacker to make the team in franchise history.

He started the year in the taxi squad, before being promoted to the active roster after Chuck Howley was injured. He played mainly on special teams, including the playoffs. 

After not agreeing with his playing time and contract numbers, he forced the team to trade him to the Houston Oilers in exchange for a conditional draft pick (not exercised) on July 13, 1973.

Houston Oilers
Coleman was waived by the Houston Oilers before the start of the 1973 season. In March 1974, he was selected by the Birmingham Americans in the 24th round (282nd overall) of the WFL Pro Draft.

Tampa Bay Buccaneers
On March 23, 1976, he was signed by the Tampa Bay Buccaneers as a free agent. He was released on July 12.

Personal life
Coleman is serving a life sentence for murder in a South Carolina state prison.  He was a suspect in several other homicides in the state but not charged. In 1993, he appeared in a film produced by the U.S. Department of Justice entitled "Hard Choices: Inside Looking Out". The film presents the story of two fictional teenagers confronted by the temptation of drug use, who are advised by two former professional athletes (Coleman and Alex English).

References

External links
Of Making Cowboys Ralph Coleman Confident

1950 births
Living people
Players of American football from Columbia, South Carolina
American football linebackers
North Carolina A&T Aggies football players
Dallas Cowboys players
American people convicted of murder
American prisoners sentenced to life imprisonment